Minnesota State Highway 200 (MN 200) is a  highway in northwest and northeast Minnesota, which runs from North Dakota Highway 200 at the North Dakota state line near Halstad, and continues east to its eastern terminus at its intersection with U.S. Highway 2 in Northeast Aitkin County, 9-miles west of Floodwood.

At the western terminus, upon crossing the Red River, the roadway continues westward as state highways numbered 200 all the way to Idaho.  Minnesota State Highway 200 is the eastern end of a nationwide chain of similarly numbered state highways that stretch from Minnesota to Idaho.

The route runs across Minnesota from west to east; connecting Ada, Mahnomen, Walker, and Floodwood.

Route description
Highway 200 serves as an east–west route in northwest and northeast Minnesota between Halstad, Ada, Mahnomen, Walker, Remer, Hill City, and Floodwood.  Highway 200 parallels U.S. Highway 2 throughout its route

For part of its route (8-miles), Highway 200 is concurrent with Highway 371 through the city of Walker.

Highway 200 passes through the following forests:

Savanna State Forest in northern Aitkin County
Hill River State Forest in northern Aitkin County 
Chippewa National Forest in Cass County 
Paul Bunyan State Forest in Hubbard County
White Earth State Forest in Clearwater and Mahnomen counties

Highway 200 crosses the Mississippi River twice: once at Jacobson in northeast Aitkin County, and once near Itasca State Park in southeast Clearwater County. Itasca State Park is located on Highways 200 and 71 at the headwaters of the Mississippi River. The north park entrance is located on Highways 92 / 200 between Park Rapids and Bagley.

Highway 200 is also known as Minnesota Avenue in Walker and Main Street in Remer.

History
Highway 200 was designated and signed  as part of a link of state routes numbered 200 stretching from Minnesota to Idaho.

The route in Minnesota was previously numbered:
State Highway 116 (from the North Dakota state line to U.S. 75.)
State Highway 31 (from U.S. 75, later the North Dakota state line to State Highway 92; later extended to Highway 371 near Walker.)
State Highway 92 (from the intersection of present-day Highways 92 and 200 to U.S. 71; then later extended to Highway 371 near Walker.)
State Highway 85 (from U.S. 71 to Highway 371 near Walker.) 
State Highway 34 (from Highway 371 at Walker to U.S. 2, west of Floodwood.)

The route was mostly gravel in 1940, mostly paved by 1953, and completely paved by 1960.

Major intersections

References

200
Transportation in Norman County, Minnesota
Transportation in Mahnomen County, Minnesota
Transportation in Clearwater County, Minnesota
Transportation in Hubbard County, Minnesota
Transportation in Cass County, Minnesota
Transportation in Aitkin County, Minnesota